Bahnhofbrücke  is a road and tramway bridge over the Limmat in the city of Zürich in the canton of Zürich in Switzerland.

Geography 
Bahnhofbrücke meaning railway station bridge, referring to the Hauptbahnhof Zürich, is situated outside of the historical core of the medieval town of Zürich. The bridge crosses the left-hand (western) and right-hand (eastern) bank of the Limmat, opposite of the Zürich Hauptbahnhof and connects the central railway station and the Central square respectively Limmatquai, connecting Rathaus and Lindenhof respectively the City and Unterstrass quarters.

Transportation 
The Zürich tram lines 3, 4, 6, 7, 10 and 15, and the local VBZ bus lines 31, 33, 34 and 46 provide public transportation, as well as Zürichsee-Schifffahrtsgesellschaft (ZSG) and its Limmat tour boats towards Zürichhorn and Landesmuseum. Private road transport towards Limmatquai, the largest pedestrian zone of Zürich, is restricted to the short roadway towards the Brun bridge and Uraniastrasse (Urania Sternwarte) at the site of the former Oetenbach nunnery; and also road transport between Central–Bahnhofbrücke, and the Bahnhofquai and Bahnhofplatz squares is allowed.

History 
The construction works started in 1847, named in 1863, and in 1871 it was extended according to the plans of Gottfried Semper by the architect F. Wanner. Redesigns of the Central–Bahnhofbrücke area occurred in 1950/51.

Literature 
 Das Limmatquai vor und nach der Neugestaltung. Aufenthaltsnutzung, Fuss- und Veloverkehrsaufkommen im Vergleich der Jahre 2004-2005-2008. Published by Tiefbau- und Entsorgungsdepartement der Stadt Zürich, Zürich 2009.

References

Bridges in Zürich
Altstadt (Zürich)
Bridges completed in 1847
Bridges over the Limmat
Road bridges in Switzerland
Railway bridges in Switzerland
Pedestrian bridges in Switzerland
1847 establishments in Switzerland
19th-century architecture in Switzerland